This is a list of Bollywood films that were released in 2021.

Box office collection
The highest-grossing Bollywood films released in 2021, by worldwide box office gross revenue, are as follows.

January–March

April–June

July–September

October–December

See also
 List of Hindi films of 2022
 List of Hindi films of 2020

Notes

References 

2021
Bollywood
Bollywood